As a member of EFTA, Norway (NO) is not included in the Classification of Territorial Units for Statistics (NUTS), but in a similar classification used for coding statistical regions of countries that are not part of the EU but are candidate countries, potential candidates or EFTA countries. The three levels are:
 level 1 (equivalent to NUTS level 1): Norway
 level 2 (equivalent to NUTS level 2): 7 Regions
 level 3 (equivalent to NUTS level 3): 19 Counties

The codes are as follows:
 NO0 Norway
 NO01 Oslo og Akershus
 NO011 Oslo
 NO012 Akershus
 NO02 Hedmark og Oppland
 NO021 Hedmark
 NO022 Oppland
 NO03 Sør-Østlandet
 NO031 Østfold
 NO032 Buskerud
 NO033 Vestfold
 NO034 Telemark
 NO04 Agder og Rogaland
 NO041 Aust-Agder
 NO042 Vest-Agder
 NO043 Rogaland
 NO05 Vestlandet
 NO051 Hordaland
 NO052 Sogn og Fjordane
 NO053 Møre og Romsdal
 NO06 Trøndelag
 NO061 Sør-Trøndelag
 NO062 Nord-Trøndelag
 NO07 Nord-Norge
 NO071 Nordland
 NO072 Troms
 NO073 Finnmark

Below these levels, there are two LAU levels (LAU-1: economic regions; LAU-2: municipalities).

The LAU codes of Norway can be downloaded here:

See also
 Subdivisions of Norway
 ISO 3166-2 codes of Norway
 FIPS region codes of Norway

References
 Hierarchical list of the Nomenclature of territorial units for statistics - NUTS and the Statistical regions of Europe
 Overview map of EFTA countries - Statistical regions at level 1
 NORGE - Statistical regions at level 2
 NORGE - Statistical regions at level 3
 Correspondence between the regional levels and the national administrative units
 Counties of Norway, Statoids.com

Norway
Subdivisions of Norway